The Public Health (Control of Disease) Act 1984 is a piece of legislation for England and Wales which requires physicians to notify the 'proper officer' of the local authority of any person deemed to be suffering from a notifiable disease. It also provides powers to isolate infected individuals to prevent the spread of such a disease. The act forms the basis of various legislation connected to the COVID-19 pandemic in the United Kingdom.

History

The Act has been discussed as a means to detain individuals with tuberculosis to prevent the spread of the disease in the UK. A 2000 article in the Journal of Public Health suggested sections of the Act may need to be amended to adhere to scrutiny from the European Convention on Human Rights, which the UK had just joined.

COVID-19 pandemic 

This Act was used as the legal basis for the regulations that put into force the stay at home order announced by Boris Johnson on 23 March 2020 in response to the COVID-19 pandemic, the Health Protection (Coronavirus, Restrictions) (England) Regulations 2020. The Health Protection (Coronavirus, Restrictions) (England) Regulations 2020 Statutory Instrument 350/2020 later gave legal force to some of the 'lockdown' rules that had been announced.

Misinformation about the Act circulated online during the COVID-19 pandemic. This included claims that it had been amended to mandate COVID-19 vaccination; according to Full Fact, the Act does not provide any power to mandate any treatment or vaccination.

See also
 Civil Contingencies Act 2004
 Public Health (Infectious Diseases) Regulations 1985
 Public Health (Infectious Diseases) Regulations 1988
Coronavirus Act 2020
British government response to the COVID-19 pandemic
Biosecurity Act 2015

References 

United Kingdom Acts of Parliament 1984
Public health in the United Kingdom
Occupational safety and health law
1984 in British law
Acts of the Parliament of the United Kingdom concerning healthcare
Law associated with the COVID-19 pandemic in the United Kingdom